The Retezat–Godeanu mountain group is a subgroup of mountains in the Southern Carpathians, Romania. It is named after the highest mountains in the group, the Retezat Mountains.

Boundaries
The Retezat–Godeanu group of mountains is bounded:
in the east, by the Jiu River;
in the west, by the Timiș-Cerna Gap (the Cerna River and the Timiș River);
in the north, by the Bistra River and the Hațeg depression.

Mountains
Retezat Mountains (Munții Retezat; literally: Hewed Mountains) 
 (Munții Godeanu) 
Vâlcan Mountains (Munții Vâlcan) 
Mehedinți Mountains (Munții Mehendinţi) 
 (Munții Cernei) 
Țarcu Mountains (Munții Țarcu; literally: Pen Mountains)

See also
Carpathian Mountains
Parâng Mountains group

External links
 Winter images from the Retezat–Godeanu Mountain group
http://www.alpinet.org/

Mountain ranges of Romania
Mountain ranges of the Southern Carpathians